= Fernando Espínola =

Paraguayan footballer (born 2000)

Personal information
- Full name: Fernando Espínola
- Date of birth: 23 June 2000 (age 26)
- Place of birth: Paraguay
- Height: 1.83 m (6 ft 0 in)
- Position: Attacking midfielder

Youth career
- Sol de América

Senior career*
Years	Team	Apps	(Gls)
2019–2020	Sol de América	3	(0)
- * Club domestic league appearances and goals as of 20:40, 21 January 2021 (UTC)

Fernando Espínola (born 26 June 2000) is a Paraguayan footballer who plays as an attacking midfielder.

== Career ==
=== Club career ===
Espínola is a product of Club Sol de América. He got his professional debut for the club in the Paraguayan Primera División on 29 April 2019, when he was in the starting lineup against Sportivo Luqueño. He made a total of three appearances in that season.
